Elizabeth Walter  (1927 – 8 May 2006) was an English writer of short stories in the horror and fantasy genres.

She was brought up in the Welsh Border country (Herefordshire), and lived in London in later life though with periodic returns to the Wye Valley and the Black Mountains. An editor for a British publishing house, she edited Collins Crime Club titles for more than thirty years, from 1961-1993.

She authored six short story collections and four novels. Three of her stories were filmed for television. Several of her supernatural tales were inspired by travels in other countries, especially Germany.

Collections of ghost stories
 Snowfall and Other Chilling Events (1965)
 The Sin Eater and Other Scientific Impossibilities (1967)
 Davy Jones' Tale and Other Supernatural Stories (1971)
 Come and Get Me and Other Uncanny Invitations (1973)
 Dead Woman and Other Haunting Experiences (1975)
 In the Mist and Other Uncanny Encounters (1979)

References

External links

1927 births
2006 deaths
Ghost story writers
English women writers
English horror writers
English fantasy writers
Women horror writers
Women science fiction and fantasy writers